Flavien Maurelet (born 16 March 1991) is a French cyclist, who currently rides for UCI Continental team .

Major results

2015
 1st Stage 2 Vuelta a Toledo
2017
 1st  Road race, National Amateur Road Championships
 1st Stage 1 Vuelta Ciclista a León
 2nd Overall Tour de Gironde
1st Stage 1
 3rd Overall Tour Nivernais Morvan
1st Stage 1
2018
 8th Polynormande
 9th Paris–Chauny
2022
 8th Grand Prix du Morbihan

References

External links

1991 births
Living people
French male cyclists
People from Senlis
Sportspeople from Oise
Cyclists from Hauts-de-France